Douglas High School (DHS) is a public secondary school in Minden, Nevada, U.S., in the Douglas County School District. The school has existed at a number of locations during its history, including the site of the current Carson Valley Middle School. It has been located on Highway 88 in Minden since 1976.

In May 2014, the campus underwent a major remodel that lasted through the summer of 2015. The remodel reworked the entire front end of the school, adding a two-story Science, Technology, Engineering and Mathematics (S.T.E.M.) building to the front of the campus.

Notable alumni
 Krysta Palmer - Olympic bronze medalist at the 2020 Tokyo Games 
 Shawn Estes - MLB pitcher (retired)
 Nicholas Furlong - songwriter and producer 
 Jeff Nady - NFL offensive lineman 
 Glen Orbik - artist and comics illustrator
 Eric Whitacre - choral composer and conductor

References

External links
Douglas County School District
Music Department Website
Sports Information

Public high schools in Nevada
School buildings completed in 1975
Schools in Douglas County, Nevada